Established in 1966, HMI Hotel Group owns and operates 46 properties across Japan. Under the principle (Life is a Journey), HMI Hotels are divided into 7 brands: Creston,Crown Palais, Seapark & Greenpark Resorts, HMI Ryokans, Hotel Wellness, Top Wellness and Pearl City Hotel. With over 10 million guests each year, HMI Hotel Group is the 8th largest hotel chain in Japan. It is headed by Ryuko Hira, with its headquarters in Nihombashi, Tokyo, Japan.

Brands operating under HMI 
There are Seven sub-brands that are presently existing under the HMI group. These hotels are categorized based on the facilities they offer.

 Hotel Crown Palais
 Hotel Pearl City
 Creston Hotel
 Resort Ryokan
 Sea Park Hotel Green Park Hotel
 Hotel wellness
 Top Wellness

Hotels 
HMI Hotel Group, known in Japan as Hotel Management International Co., Ltd., was established in 1998, and manages about 60 resort and business hotels in Japan.

 Hotel Pearl City Sapporo, Sapporo
 Hotel Pearl City Sendai, Sendai
 Shibuya Creston Hotel, Tokyo
 Nagoya Creston Hotel, Nagoya
 Hotel Pearl City Kobe, Kobe, where the company is headquartered
 Crown Palais Kitakyushu, Kitakyushu
 Rizzan Sea-Park Hotel Tancha-Bay, Onna, Okinawa
etc.

Owned by Ryuko Hira
HMI Hotel Group is owned by Ryuko Hira. He was born in Jaipur, Rajasthan, India, in 1948.  After trading in gemstones and precious metals in Tokyo, he married a Japanese woman, became a naturalized Japanese citizen, and adopted a Japanese name, Ryūko Hira (Japanese: 比良竜虎). 

In 1991 Hira established the Hotel Pearl City Kobe, which also serves as HMI Hotel Group's headquarters.  Since that time, he has mainly bought the operating rights of existing hotels. He also is one of the directors of Japan-India Association, Tokyo.

References

External links
Official Website

Companies based in Hyōgo Prefecture
Hospitality companies of Japan
Hotel chains in Japan
Japanese brands